Markus Lukas Frank (born 1969) is a German horn player and conductor.

Life and career 

After his studies, he was horn player with the NDR Sinfonieorchester Hamburg. During this time, he also played as solo hornist with other orchestras and also studied conducting with Klauspeter Seibel at the Hochschule für Musik und Theater Hamburg. From 1998, he was 2nd Kapellmeister at the Opernhaus Kiel and played during this time with the Philharmonisches Orchester Kiel Cyrano de Bergerac by Franco Alfano.

In 2003, he became 1st Kapellmeister and Generalmusikdirektor (GMD) at the Anhaltisches Theater in Dessau. He has made guest appearances at the Staatsoper Hannover and conducted the ballets Swan Lake by Tchaikovsky and Le sacre du printemps by Igor Stravinsky. In 2005, he made his debut with Humperdinck's Hänsel und Gretel at the Deutsche Oper Berlin, where he later conducted Die Zauberflöte by Mozart several times.

Frank became general music director of the Loh-Orchester Sondershausen in 2008. Since 2012/2013, he has held a teaching position for orchestral conducting at the Hochschule für Musik Franz Liszt, Weimar.

As of the 2016/2017 season, he was appointed GMD of the Anhaltische Philharmonie at the Anhaltisches Theater Dessau as successor to Antony Hermus.

Recordings 
 Franco Alfano: Cyrano de Bergerac, Philharmonisches Orchester Kiel, cpo, Georgsmarienhütte 2002, .
 Engelbert Humperdinck: Hänsel und Gretel, Arthaus-Musik, Halle (Saale) 2008, .
 Walter Braunfels: Don Juan/Sinfonische Variationen, Philharmonisches Orchester Altenburg-Gera, Capriccio, 2016.

References

External links 
 
 Neuer Generalmusikdirektor auf kyffhaeuser-nachrichten.de, 22. Juli 2008
 Markus L. Frank auf der Website des Anhaltischen Theaters Dessau
 Ute König: Neuer Generalmusikdirektor am Anhaltischen Theater. Der sympathische Könner. In Mitteldeutsche Zeitung. 1 March 2016.
 

Music directors
Classical horn players
1969 births
Living people
People from Schwäbisch Hall